In the Chokwe people of Central Africa, the chikunga is a sacred ceremonial mask. Of the many ceremonial masks, the chikunga is considered to be the most powerful, and it is only worn by the tribal chief. The chikunga mask is made by stretching barkcloth over an array of wicker bits. It then is painted black with red and white designs. It is typically used during the coronation of a chief, or during sacrifices to the ancestors.

Chokwe